Midnight in the Labyrinth is an orchestral compilation album by English extreme metal band Cradle of Filth (although "orchestrations" are credited to keyboard player Mark Newby-Robson and no orchestra or string-section is listed in the album's personnel). The re-recorded songs selected are from the band's first four releases. The title comes from the lyrics of "Mistress from the Sucking Pit", a bonus track on some editions of Darkly, Darkly, Venus Aversa.

The album was released to coincide with Record Store Day on 21 April in participating countries. It was released worldwide on 4 May. Disc One features narration by Dani Filth, plus additional vocals from Sarah Jezebel Deva. Disc Two contains the same recordings minus the vocals. The first disc also includes "Goetia (Invoking the Unclean)", a thirteen-minute "aural séance", recycling the titles of Cradle's abandoned and wiped first album, and first demo.

A demo of the orchestral version of "Summer Dying Fast" appeared as a teaser on the EP Evermore Darkly, and the narrated version of "A Gothic Romance (Red Roses for the Devil's Whore)" was released online, preceding the album on 4 April.

Production and recording
According to vocalist Dani Filth, the album would "reinvent" tracks from the band's first four albums and include "full soundtrack-quality stuff... with choirs, strings and some narration". Filth wrote in an online update:

Guitarist Paul Allender stated in an interview:

Sarah Jezebel Deva announced via her Facebook page that she would be re-joining Cradle of Filth for this release:

Track listing

Personnel
 Mark Newby-Robson – orchestration
 Dani Filth – male narration
 Sarah Jezebel Deva – female narration, additional vocals
 Kit Woolven – mixer

References

External links 
 CoF Orchestral Album
 CoF Forum Topic

Cradle of Filth albums
2012 compilation albums
Peaceville Records compilation albums
Nuclear Blast compilation albums